Roy S. Williams, also listed as Roy K. Williams,  (July 24, 1907 – July 17, 1944) was an American baseball pitcher in the Negro leagues. He played with several clubs from 1930 to 1935. His brother Harry Williams also played in the Negro leagues.

References

External links
 and Baseball-Reference Black Baseball stats and Seamheads

Howard University alumni
Baltimore Black Sox players
Brooklyn Eagles players
Homestead Grays players
Memphis Red Sox players
Pittsburgh Crawfords players
1907 births
1944 deaths
Baseball players from Georgia (U.S. state)
Baseball pitchers
20th-century African-American sportspeople